In economics, British disease was a derogatory term to describe the period of economic stagnation in the United Kingdom in the 1970s at the time the country was widely described as the "sick man of Europe". It was characterised by rates of capital investment and labour productivity which lagged behind continental Europe, as well as strained industrial relations. The term relates to a lack of social vitality during industrial disputes in the 1970s. 

A lack of productivity of the UK economy was one factor behind Margaret Thatcher's economic reforms.

See also
 Dutch disease
 Accession of the United Kingdom to the European Communities (1973)
 Labour government, 1974–1979
 Thatcherism
 Social history of Postwar Britain (1945–1979)

References

External links
 LSE July 2016 blog

1970s in the United Kingdom
20th century in the United Kingdom
Anti-British sentiment
Economic history of the United Kingdom